Stachys chamissonis is a species of flowering plant in the mint family known by the common name coastal hedgenettle. It is a perennial herb native to the west coast of North America, where it grows in moist coastal habitat from Alaska to central California. This mint produces an erect stem . It is hairy, glandular, and aromatic. The hairy, glandular inflorescence is made up of interrupted clusters of up to six flowers each. The corollas are borne in hairy calyces of purple or purple-tinged sepals.

References

External links

Photo gallery

chamissonis
Flora of Western Canada
Flora of the Northwestern United States
Flora of the Southwestern United States
Flora without expected TNC conservation status